Kanpatimar Shankariya (1952 – 16 May 1979) was an Indian serial killer. 

He was born in Jaipur, Rajasthan in 1952 and arrested at the age of 26. He confessed that he had killed at least 70 people in 1977–1978 for pleasure. He killed his victims by hitting them with a hammer on the neck below the ears, which gained him moniker Kanpatimar. He was convicted in early 1979 and was hanged at Jaipur on 16 May 1979. He repented, and his last words before being hanged were: "I have murdered in vain. Nobody should become like me."

See also 
 List of serial killers by country
 List of serial killers by number of victims

References 

1952 births
1979 deaths
Executed Indian serial killers
Male serial killers
People executed by India by hanging
People from Jaipur
Indian people convicted of murder
Crime in Rajasthan